Érico Roberto Mendes Alves Castro (born 22 September 1992) is a professional footballer who plays as an attacking midfielder for Petro Luanda. Born in Portugal, he represents the Angola national team.

Career
Castro spent most of his playing career in Portugal in the Campeonato de Portugal. He began his senior career with Tires, and thereafter had stints with Oeiras, Fátima, Aljustrelense, Real, Sintrense, Casa Pia, Felgueiras, and Louletano. He moved to Angola with Petro Luanda on 23 August 2021.

International career
Born in Portugal, Castro is of Angolan descent. He debuted for the Angola national team in a 3–1 2022 FIFA World Cup qualification win over Gabon on 8 October 2021.

References

External links
 
 

1992 births
Living people
People from Oeiras, Portugal
Angolan footballers
Angola international footballers
Portuguese footballers
Portuguese sportspeople of Angolan descent
Association football midfielders
AD Oeiras players
C.D. Fátima players
Real S.C. players
S.U. Sintrense players
Casa Pia A.C. players
F.C. Felgueiras 1932 players
Louletano D.C. players
Liga Portugal 2 players
Campeonato de Portugal (league) players
Girabola players
Sportspeople from Lisbon District